The 52nd edition of the World Allround Speed Skating Championships for Women took place on 2 and 3 February 1991 in Hamar at the Hamar Stadion ice rink.

Title holder was Jacqueline Börner from East Germany.

Distance medalists

Classification

 DNS = Did not start
 * Fell

Source:

References

1991 in speed skating
1991 in women's speed skating
1991 World Allround